

447001–447100 

|-bgcolor=#f2f2f2
| colspan=4 align=center | 
|}

447101–447200 

|-bgcolor=#f2f2f2
| colspan=4 align=center | 
|}

447201–447300 

|-bgcolor=#f2f2f2
| colspan=4 align=center | 
|}

447301–447400 

|-bgcolor=#f2f2f2
| colspan=4 align=center | 
|}

447401–447500 

|-bgcolor=#f2f2f2
| colspan=4 align=center | 
|}

447501–447600 

|-bgcolor=#f2f2f2
| colspan=4 align=center | 
|}

447601–447700 

|-id=682
| 447682 Rambaldi ||  || Carlo Rambaldi (1925–2012), an Italian special effects artist and winner of three Academy awards for best visual effects for the feature movies King Kong (1976), Alien (1979) and E.T. the Extra-Terrestrial (1982). || 
|}

447701–447800 

|-bgcolor=#f2f2f2
| colspan=4 align=center | 
|}

447801–447900 

|-bgcolor=#f2f2f2
| colspan=4 align=center | 
|}

447901–448000 

|-bgcolor=#f2f2f2
| colspan=4 align=center | 
|}

References 

447001-448000